Oscar O'Neill Oxholm  (28 April 1809 – 15 October 1871) was a Danish military officer, chamberlain and landowner. He owned Rosenfeldt Manor at Vordingborg from 1841.

Early life
Oxholm was the son of the former Ann O'Neill and Peter Lotharius Oxholm, who served as governor-general of the Danish West Indies from 1815 to 1816 who participated in the Battle of Køge in 1807. His mother was the daughter of a plantation owner on St. Croix.

His father owned a mansion of the corner of Sankt Annæ Gade and Amaliegade (which was acquired by King Frederick VI in 1826 who put it at the disposal of Prince William of Hesse-Kassel, who lived there until his death in 1867), as well as the St. George Hill, Sally's Fancy, and Hope plantations in Saint Croix.

Career

Oxholm began his career in the Royal Danish Army at the Foot Guards. In 1848, he was freed from service to serve as adjudant for Frederick VII. He reached the rank of Major-General and was appointed to chamberlain.

Oxholm purchased Rosenfeldt Manor at Vordingborg in 1841. He constructed the new main building, two farm buildings and 20 fæstegårde. Designed by Henrik Steffens Sibbern, the main building was built from 1868 to 1870.

Personal life

Oxholm married the Irish Adelaide Maria O'Kelly (1817-1842) in 1842. Together, they had three sons:

 Carl Arthur O'Neill Oxholm (1843–1914), who married Sophie Marguerite Bech (1848–1935), a daughter of Danish diplomat Edward Bech.
 Fritz Johan Georg O'Neill Oxholm (1850–1878), who died unmarried.
 Oscar Siegfred Christian O'Neill Oxholm (1855–1926), a courtier, chamberlain, and master of ceremonies who married Countess Fritze Wilhelmine Wanda Theodora Holstein, a daughter of Prime Minister Ludvig Holstein-Holsteinborg.

He died on 15 October 1871 and is buried at Kastrup Cemetery. As his eldest son died without issue in 1914, the Rosenfeldt estate passed to his daughter-in-law Sophie, and following her death in 1935, his grandson, Oscar O'Neill Oxholm, who served as the Danish ambassador to China from 1932 to 1939.

References

External links

Oscar O'Neill Oxholm at geni.com

Danish military officers
19th-century Danish landowners
Oxholm family
1809 births
1871 deaths